The Society of Environmental Engineers (SEE) was a British professional engineering institution founded in 1959, which ceased operations in 2019.  It was licensed by the Engineering Council UK to assess candidates for inclusion on ECUK's Register of Professional Engineers and Technicians at CEng, IEng and Eng Tech levels. It was also licensed by the Society for the Environment (SocEnv) to assess candidates for CEnv. The Society's Membership Journal "Environmental Engineering" was published six times a year by the Society's partner Concorde Publishing Ltd, along with the journal's digital and online editions. Members also received other technology focused supplements including Test House Directory. Members of SEE were invited to transfer membership to the Society of Operations Engineers, free of charge, in 2019.

See also 
 Chartered engineer
 Incorporated engineer
 Engineering technician

External links 
 Society of Environmental Engineers
 Environmental Engineering online journal

ECUK Licensed Members
Engineering societies based in the United Kingdom
Organisations based in Hertfordshire
Science and technology in Hertfordshire
Fellows of the Society of Environmental Engineers